Dimitrovo is the name of several rural localities in Russia:
Dimitrovo, Jewish Autonomous Oblast, a selo in Birobidzhansky District of the Jewish Autonomous Oblast
Dimitrovo, Kemerovo Oblast, a settlement in Ulanovskaya Rural Territory of Yaysky District of Kemerovo Oblast